Brave Robot is a brand of vegan ice cream made using Perfect Day's synthesized milk proteins. It has no lactose, but does include synthetic molecules reproducing those found in milk.
The ice cream comes in 8 flavors: Raspberry White Truffle, Blueberry Pie, A Lot of Chocolate, Peanut Butter 'n Fudge, Hazelnut Chocolate Chunk, Buttery Pecan, Vanilla 'n Cookies, and Vanilla.

References

Dairy-free frozen dessert brands
Vegan cuisine